The 2006–07 Georgian Cup (also known as the David Kipiani Cup) was the sixty-third season overall and seventeenth since independence of the Georgian annual football tournament. The competition began on 10 August 2006 and ended with the Final held on 26 May 2007. The defending champions are Ameri Tbilisi.

First round 

|}

Group stage

Group A

Group B

Group C

Group D

Quarterfinals 
The matches were played on 18 February (first legs) and 6 March 2007 (second legs).

|}

Semifinals 
The matches were played on 1 April (first legs) and 1 May 2007 (second legs).

|}

Final

See also 
 2006–07 Umaglesi Liga
 2006–07 Pirveli Liga

External links 
 The Rec.Sport.Soccer Statistics Foundation.
 es.geofootball.com  

Georgian Cup seasons
Cup
Georgian Cup, 2006-07